The Old Parliament House is the former seat of the Parliament of Sweden, located at Birger Jarls torg, on the Riddarholmen (island), in central Stockholm. It was used until January 1905, when the building on Helgeandsholmen was inaugurated.

History
The Old Parliament House was the seat of:
the Riksdag of the Estates from 1833 to 1866 
the bicameral Riksdag from 1866 to 1905. 

An additional section on the seaside was designed in 1911 by Aron Johansson, in the National Romantic style.

See also 
 Architecture of Stockholm
 History of the Riksdag
 House of the Estates
 Parliament House, Stockholm — housing the Swedish Parliament since 1910.

References

External links

Buildings and structures in Stockholm
Government buildings in Sweden
Legislative buildings in Europe
Former seats of national legislatures
Historic sites in Sweden
National Romantic architecture in Sweden
Art Nouveau architecture in Stockholm
Art Nouveau government buildings
Government buildings completed in 1833
Government buildings completed in 1911
1911 establishments in Sweden
1833 establishments in Sweden
Palaces in Sweden